Marie Collart-Henrotin (5 December 1842 – 8 October 1911) was a Belgian artist who mainly painted landscapes and animals.

Biography
She was born in Brussels. Collart was primarily self-taught as an artist, but benefited from the advice of Alfred Verwee,  and the art dealer and critic . She became a founding member of the Société Libre des Beaux-Arts in 1868. In 1870, she won a gold medal at the Salon des artistes français. In 1871, Collart married Edmond Henrotin, an artillery captain; he died in 1894. She became the first women to be named a Chevalier in the Belgian Order of Leopold in 1880. She won gold medals at exhibitions in Ghent (1881), in Paris and in Brussels (1897). Collart exhibited her work at the Palace of Fine Arts and The Woman's Building at the 1893 World's Columbian Exposition in Chicago, Illinois.

Her work is included in the collections of the Royal Museum of Fine Arts Antwerp and Royal Museums of Fine Arts of Belgium.

References

External links

1842 births
1911 deaths
19th-century Belgian women artists
20th-century Belgian women artists
Artists from Brussels
Belgian landscape painters
Belgian women painters